KNRO (1400 AM) is a radio station that carries a sports format.  Licensed to Redding, California, United States, the station serves the Redding and Red Bluff areas. The station is owned by Stephens Media Group, through licensee SMG-Redding, LLC, and features programming from Fox Sports Radio.

History
The station was assigned the call letters KAZT on September 9, 1998, and hit the air at frequency 600 AM. On January 22, 2001, the station changed its call sign to the current KNRO. During much of its life as KNRO the station was primarily a sports format.  During that time, the frequency was moved from 600 to 1670 AM.  From 2001 to 2010, the station was primarily an ESPN Radio affiliate before changing to Fox Sports Radio.

Programming
KNRO simulcasts all of its programming on translator station K280GP 103.9 FM in Redding, California.

On August 22, 2016, KNRO and its sports format moved to 1400 AM Redding, swapping frequencies with news/talk KQMS, which moved to 1670 kHz AM Redding.

Past program directors
George Tharalson (2001–2004) – host of The Cheap Seats, also news director of KQMS

See also
List of radio stations in California

Translators
KNRO broadcasts on the following translator:

References

External links
FCC History Cards for KNRO

NRO
Sports radio stations in the United States
Radio stations established in 1954
Fox Sports Radio stations
1954 establishments in California